Sri Hartamas (Golden Estates in English) is an affluent residential township in the Segambut constituency of the Federal Territory of Kuala Lumpur, Malaysia. The zip and postal code is 50480 or 51200.

Location, area description and demographic

Sri Hartamas is located right next to Mont Kiara, another affluent township consisting of mainly high-rise apartment buildings and contains a significant expatriate community, as well as Bukit Damansara to the southeast.

Sri Hartamas has a geographical advantage – this township is located very close to the intersection of four major expressways – the NKVE , PLUS , SPRINT  and DUKE  that link the area with downtown Kuala Lumpur, surrounding suburbs as well as other major towns of Malaysia. The travel time to anywhere in the Klang Valley area, as a result is relatively short, even during rush hour. 

Residents of the neighbourhood participate in the resident's association. In years past, the association has hired a private security firm to patrol the area. The relative isolation of Sri Hartamas and the surrounding area made it prey to crime for a while, though this is not so prevalent today. It is next to the new Immigration Department on one side and the old tax offices on the other, so there can be delays during rush hour. A large mosque is also nearby and this does give rise to a large volumes of traffic, particularly on Friday lunchtimes.

The homes in Sri Hartamas consists of low rise condominium, retail and shopping blocks, townhouses, adjoining semi detached homes and small town bungalows. Built by a Malaysian developer in the 80s, the streets are wide, compared to other areas. The wide streets turned out to a boon for multi car households that live in the area with limited garage space when the neighbourhood went through a renaissance period.

History

1990s Renaissance 
Sri Hartamas gained considerable popularity as a desired neighbourhood during the Asian boom of the mid 1990s. Prior to that, the belief by Malaysians was that the neighbourhood was too isolated (it was located halfway between Kepong and downtown KL), with little to no infrastructure in the area. With no grocer in the neighbourhood at the time, a pint of milk was a 15-minute drive away. As the demand for quality housing in Kuala Lumpur increased, this soon became irrelevant.

Indeed, easy transportation access by virtue of being close to the expressways, proved to be Sri Hartamas's saviour. Other developments in the area followed. Down the street, a huge condominium project, "Mont Kiara", soon took off.

Mont Kiara as well as Sri Hartamas quickly became very popular, not only with the Malaysian young professionals, but also with expatriate families, who hail mostly from Australia, Japan, China, Britain and mainland Europe.

The extra security and the two international private schools in Sri Hartamas that opened at this time made the area a boon for expatriate families. Sri Hartamas, circa 1996–1999 became an international neighbourhood, with residents originating from different countries.

Americans as well as single expatriates on the contrary tended to prefer living in nearby Bangsar, another neighbourhood closer to restaurants, clubs, bars and shopping malls.

Changes post-1990s boom 
The area has made significant progress when it was first planned by Sri Hartamas Development Sdn Bhd to develop the 260-acre township on a rubber plantation. From there, the firm was established under a joint venture with real estate tycoon Tan Sri Chong Kok Lim, Datuk Syed Kechik from Kumpulan Syed Kechik Sdn Bhd and Datuk Wong Kee Tat from Kuala Lumpur Industries Holdings Berhad. The township development ranges from landed properties, terrace houses and semi-detached houses to shoplots.

Another development followed, this time bringing some of the infrastructure that Sri Hartamas initially lacked: restaurants, shops, bars and as well as an outdoor Malaysian style food bazaar. Much of the shops and pricing cater to the relatively affluent and expatriate demographic of the area.

Sri Hartamas in the 21st century 

The isolation and greenery of Sri Hartamas, with easy access to anywhere; the trademark of the area, gave away some of its lustre when access to a third expressway opened up in 2004 that links the area with the rest of Kuala Lumpur. The expressway is known as Sprint Expressway whereby it is one of the busiest expressway during rush hour traffic.

Little of the greenery remains and hence Sri Hartamas is not as quiet as it used to be. The traffic influx as well as other new developments nearby has brought an increasing number of people to the area. Through some of its isolation is gone, the young Malaysian professionals that initially moved into the area stayed on.

However, the expatriate community that once lived here in large numbers dwindled after the Asian Financial Crisis of 1997–1999, when people moved back to their home countries. The area continues to be popular with expatriate families, particularly those with children.

Though no reliable census exists, there is a healthy balance in the number of residents from the different Malaysian ethnic groups in Sri Hartamas, with no obvious majority group, unlike other parts of Malaysia.

In terms of night life Sri Hartamas is now a small, vibrant community. Of particular interest is the wide range of restaurants and bars that have developed around the shopping area in Desa Sri Hartamas. Whilst there are some western style expat bars, there is also a good food court and a multitude of Asian-fusion, Japanese, Thai and Malaysian restaurants.

Upscale amenities and conveniences 

For Malaysia, the area conveniences reflect the demographic, a sharp contrast to other areas of Kuala Lumpur: A nursery in Sri Hartamas, aside from childcare, offers introductory classes in French. There is a disproportionate number of Japanese and Asian-fusion restaurants in Sri Hartamas, catering to the large number of Japanese now living in nearby Mont Kiara.

Amenities nearby include: 2 golf courses (KLGCC), a country club, a very "posh" health club and spa, several American chain stores and other conveniences, such as being within 20 minutes delivery of Pizza Hut or Domino's. The Hartamas Shopping Centre (housed inside Plaza Damas) is the area's biggest shopping mall.

Infrastructure and facilities

Basic infrastructure
Infrastructure here is excellent, with developed country utility services and operating standards (i.e. Wired telephone, electricity & broadband internet) and services (i.e. trash collection). Prior to 1995, due to the terrain of the area, mobile phone coverage here on certain operators in Sri Hartamas was spotty at best. Today, all mobile phone carriers have base stations throughout the neighbourhood, with excellent coverage.

Education
Sri Hartamas is home to many government and private schools.

Kindergartens:
Taska Seri Hartamas (government)
Smart Reader Kids Desa Seri Hartamas (private)
Garden International School Early Years Centre (private)

Primary School:
Sekolah Kebangsaan Seri Hartamas (Seri Hartamas National School)

Secondary School:
Sekolah Menengah Kebangsaan Seri Hartamas (Seri Hartamas National Secondary School)

Colleges:
 Taylor's College Sri Hartamas Campus (private) (closed since 2018)
SRI College (private)

Politics
Sri Hartamas is part of the Segambut constituency, currently represented in the Malaysian Parliament by Hannah Yeoh of the DAP since 2018.

Sri Hartamas on Television
Sri Hartamas was featured on the American CBS series, The Amazing Race Series 11 "All-Stars" in April 2007. As a challenge, the contestants' who flew in from Poland in Leg 9 of the series, were asked to roam the neighbourhood soliciting "surat khabar lama" (Malay), or "old newspapers" (English) from Sri Hartamas residents for recycling.

Access

Public transportation 
Sri Hartamas is served by the  Segambut KTM Komuter station on the Tanjong Malim-Port Klang Line, run by state railway firm KTMB (Malayan Railways). rapidKL bus route 190 connects Sri Hartamas and Mont Kiara to the KTM station. However, as a result of ongoing track upgrading works, Komuter services for this station is restricted to peak hours only. During off-peak hours, shuttle bus KTM3 to KL Sentral is provided.

As an alternative, rapidKL buses T818 and T852 also connect Sri Hartamas to  Pusat Bandar Damansara MRT station on the Kajang Line (SBK Line).

The area is planned to be served by the  Sri Hartamas MRT station in the future which is part of the proposed MRT Circle Line.

References

Suburbs in Kuala Lumpur